Mississippi State, Mississippi is a census-designated place in Oktibbeha County, Mississippi, United States. It is the official designated name for the area encompassing Mississippi State University, which lies partly in the nearby incorporated municipality of Starkville. The population at the 2020 census was 4,968.

United States Postal Service designation is "Mississippi State, Mississippi 39762".

Demographics

2020 census

Note: the US Census treats Hispanic/Latino as an ethnic category. This table excludes Latinos from the racial categories and assigns them to a separate category. Hispanics/Latinos can be of any race.

References

External links
Coordinates and Maps: 

Census-designated places in Mississippi
Mississippi State University
Census-designated places in Oktibbeha County, Mississippi